A superior costotransverse ligament is a strong fibrous band that arises from the neck of a rib to the transverse process of the vertebra above. It comprises two sets of fibers. The anterior set passes obliquely superiorly and laterally from the sharp crest on the superior border of the neck of each rib to the anterior surface of the transverse process of the vertebra immediately superior to it. The posterior set passes superiorly and medially from the crest on the superior border of the neck of the rib to the inferior border of the transverse process of the vertebra immediately superior to it. The ligament may be absent for the first rib.

References

Thorax (human anatomy)
Ligaments